Jason Mudrick is the founder and chief investment officer of Mudrick Capital Management, an investment firm focused on special situations and deep value event driven investing. As of June 2022, Mudrick Capital managed $3.3 billion in assets.

Career
After graduating from Harvard Law School in 2000, Jason started his career as an investment banker in the Mergers & Acquisitions Investment Banking Division of Merrill Lynch & Co.  In 2001, he joined Contrarian Capital Management, where he was a managing director and portfolio manager for seven years. While at Contrarian, Mudrick managed the Contrarian Equity Fund, a fund specializing in distressed debt and post-bankruptcy equities. Mudrick grew that business to peak assets of approximately $400 million. He left Contrarian in 2008 and founded Mudrick Capital in 2009 with $5 million under management.

Fortune Magazine named Jason one of the "Best Traders of Wall Street" in 2011, specifically citing his winning bets on CIT and SuperMedia. Jason was named as one of the 2010 Rising Stars of Hedge Funds from Institutional Investor. By 2016, Mudrick's eponymous firm was managing $1.3 billion and by 2019, $2.7 billion. It averaged 12.3 percent annualized returns in its first decade.

Mudrick Capital was one of the top performing hedge funds in 2019 with an annual gain of 28.8 percent, compared with the average hedge fund, which was up 11.4 per cent. Much of the fund's success that year was the result of its 51 percent ownership interest in NJOY, which it had purchased in 2017, when the company was on the brink of bankruptcy. By 2017 the company's sales were up by over 1,100 percent year-on-year.

During the Covid pandemic, Mudrick did not leave New York or close his offices, citing market opportunities; instead he installed devices to measure employee temperatures and established protocols for keeping employees distanced. 

In 2021, Mudrick gained attention when his firm made $200 million in the month of January, with the bulk of gains coming from debt and equity options for AMC Entertainment Holdings, Inc. and out-of-the-money options for GameStop. Both companies’ stocks soared during a Reddit-fueled retail investor rally. According to Reuters, Mudrick Capital was seen as a hero by the retail investors because the firm did not short sell AMC's stock, but rather helped rescue the company through clever financing. On June 1, 2021, Mudrick entered into an agreement to purchase $230.5 million worth of shares from AMC Entertainment Holdings, Inc. – 8.5 million of Class A common stock at $27.12 per share, only to dump its stake later in the day to cash in on the "meme stock" frenzy. Mudrick cited the stock as "massively overvalued." 

Jason has served on multiple creditors' committees and served on the board of directors of numerous public and private companies, including Safety-Kleen Holdings, Integrated Alarm Services Group, Salton, Rotech Healthcare, NJOY Holdings, Corporate Risk Holdings, Mudrick Capital Acquisition Corporation, Fieldwood Energy, Proenza Schouler, cxLoyalty and Dex Media, where he is currently the chairman of the board.

Personal life
Mudrick has a BA from the University of Chicago and a JD from Harvard Law School.

References

External links
Mudrick Capital Management
Current Investments

American financial analysts
American financiers
American hedge fund managers
American investment bankers
American investors
American money managers
University of Chicago alumni
Harvard Law School alumni
Living people
1975 births
Chief investment officers